Myth and magic may refer to:
 Myth and ritual, two central components of religious practice
 Myth and Magic: Art according to the Inklings, a 2007 essay collection of Tolkien research by Eduardo Segura and Thomas Honegger, published by Walking Tree Publishers
 Myth and Magic: The Art of John Howe, a 2001 book of art by John Howe inspired by Tolkien's fantasy novels

See also
 Man, Myth & Magic (disambiguation)